Ana Ivanovic was the defending champion, but she chose to participate at the Brisbane International instead.

Venus Williams made her second straight ASB Classic final and won the title, defeating Caroline Wozniacki 2–6, 6–3, 6–3.

Seeds

Draw

Finals

Top half

Bottom half

Qualifying

Seeds

Qualifiers

Qualifying draw

First qualifier

Second qualifier

Third qualifier

Fourth qualifier

External links
 Main draw
 Qualifying draw

ASB Classic – Singles
WTA Auckland Open